Aloha is a 2015 American romantic comedy film written, co-produced and directed by Cameron Crowe. The film stars Bradley Cooper as former US Air Force officer Brian Gilcrest, who returns to Hawaii after being rehired by a former boss to oversee the launch of a privatized weapons satellite in the skies over Hawaii. Emma Stone, Rachel McAdams, Bill Murray, John Krasinski, Danny McBride, and Alec Baldwin star in supporting roles.

Aloha was released on May 29, 2015, and was a box office bomb, grossing $26.2 million worldwide against a budget of $37 million. It received negative reviews from critics, who derided its screenplay and accused the film of whitewashing.

Plot 
Military contractor Brian Gilcrest returns to Hawaii on behalf of billionaire Carson Welch, who intends to develop local land into a space center. Following a celebrated military career that ended in shadowy deals in Afghanistan, the now disillusioned Gilcrest has to negotiate a deal with the Native Hawaiians and support Carson's launch of a privately funded satellite. His mission is complicated by his former girlfriend Tracy, now married with two children, and his idealistic Air Force liaison, Captain Allison Ng, whose wide-eyed fascination with space reminds him of his own childhood sense of wonder.

Gilcrest and Ng meet King Kanahele at his isolated community to negotiate a deal. They require his participation in a blessing ceremony that will allow Welch to build his center. Ng tries to engage Gilcrest in conversation about his life and work but is unable to break through. Meeting the king, Ng, who is one quarter Hawaiian, bonds with him and his companions, sharing their spiritual view of the land and sky. After prolonged negotiations, Gilcrest brokers a deal with the king in exchange for control over the territory of two whole mountains and free cell phone service for the area. The next night, Gilcrest and Ng have dinner at Tracy's, where they meet her husband Woody and their two children, Grace and Mitchell. At one point, Gilcrest and Tracy are alone in the kitchen, and she admits she loved him and had plans to make a life with him before he abandoned her thirteen years ago.

The next evening, they attend Carson's Christmas party, where the commander of Pacific Air Forces General Dixon tells Gilcrest not to screw up their deal with the Hawaiians. One of the general's men hands Gilcrest a thumb drive containing top secret information for the upcoming satellite launch. During the party, Gilcrest becomes attracted to Ng, who is having fun dancing with Carson. Afterwards, Ng joins Gilcrest in his room while he recounts his experiences in Kabul, where he almost died. He tells her that this was the first night he was truly happy to be living, and the two have sex. The next day, Ng discovers that Carson's satellite will actually carry a nuclear payload. When she tries to resign, her colonel tells her it is a private operation run by Carson and that Gilcrest is aware of the details. Later she confronts Gilcrest in tears for lying to her and the Hawaiians.

Meanwhile, Woody and Tracy confront each other about recent tensions in their marriage, which he believes were caused by Gilcrest's arrival. They agree to separate. The next morning, Tracy shows up at Gilcrest's hotel and reveals that Grace is his daughter. Later that day, after the successful blessing of the new pedestrian gate, Gilcrest learns that the Chinese are attempting to hack the satellite's code to prevent the impending launch. He rushes to the command center and undermines the hackers' efforts. As he watches the satellite enter geosynchronous orbit, he realizes what he's done and its impact on Ng, whom he has come to love. Quickly, he orders a massive sonic upload to be sent to space, and he and Ng hold hands as they watch the satellite explode. Believing Ng's continued association with him will ruin her promising career, he tells her they should not see each other again.

Carson, displeased with the destruction of his satellite, confronts Gilcrest, who tells him he cannot "buy the sky". General Dixon is also incensed by Gilcrest's actions, threatening to prosecute him.

Gilcrest returns to Tracy's, where she reads him a moving love letter from Woody. He tells her she belongs with her husband, and she encourages him to go after Ng. Woody comes home and sees Gilcrest in his house. Woody tells him he knows he is Grace's father. He asks Gilcrest if he slept with Tracy while he was gone. Gilcrest tells Woody he slept with Ng and not with Tracy. Woody goes into the living room where Tracy is cleaning up. She sees Woody and they run into each other's arms, then are joined by Grace and Mitchell. Gilcrest leaves while the happy family reunion continues.

General Dixon soon learns Gilcrest was telling the truth about the nuclear weapons payload, praising him for what he's done, revealing that authorities will soon be taking Carson into custody. Outside the hotel, Gilcrest finds Ng, who is preparing to leave. He tells her he loves her, is staying in Hawaii and will be waiting for her to return. Later that night, Gilcrest stands outside Grace's hula class and watches her dance. She notices him, he nods at her, and she suddenly realizes he is her father. With tears of joy in her eyes, she runs outside and embraces him then returns to her hula class.

Cast 
 Bradley Cooper as Brian Gilcrest, a military contractor.
 Emma Stone as Captain Allison Ng, an Air Force pilot.
 Rachel McAdams as Tracy Woodside, Brian's ex-girlfriend, married to John Woodside.
 Bill Murray as Carson Welch, a billionaire.
 John Krasinski as Major John "Woody" Woodside, Tracy's husband, an Air Force pilot.
 Danny McBride as Colonel "Fingers" Lacy
 Alec Baldwin as General Dixon Commander of Pacific Air Forces (PACAF)
 Bill Camp as Bob Largent
 Michael Chernus as Roy
 Danielle Rose Russell as Grace, Tracy's daughter
 Jaeden Martell as Mitchell, Tracy's son.
 Edi Gathegi as Lieutenant Colonel Curtis
 Ivana Miličević as Carson's biographer
 Bumpy Kanahele as himself

Production 
Emma Stone was first to be cast in the film in 2012.

On July 31, 2013, Alec Baldwin joined the cast of the film. There was a casting call for extras on August 29 on Oahu. Cooper went to Hawaii on September 14, twelve days before filming began.

On October 7, it was announced that principal photography was still underway in Hawaii. Stone received ground training on how to fly the Piper PA44-180 Seminole airplane from Rob Moore, Chief Instructor Pilot of Galvin Flight Services Hawaii, who later flew the airplane near Ka'a'awa Valley for the inflight shots. Moore acted as the aviation technical advisor. Cooper was filming in downtown Honolulu on December 18 and 19. On February 2, 2015, Sony Pictures stated that the film's final title would be Aloha; the previous working titles were Deep Tiki and Volcano Romance.

Music 
The musical score for Aloha was composed by Jónsi & Alex, following Jónsi's collaboration with Crowe on We Bought a Zoo (2011). Originally, Mark Mothersbaugh said in May 2014 that he was going to score the film. A soundtrack album was released on May 26, 2015 by Madison Gate Records and Sony Legacy, which included tracks by Vancouver Sleep Clinic, Fleetwood Mac, David Crosby, Jonsi & Alex, Beck and Josh Ritter.

Release 
On February 14, 2014, it was announced that the film was scheduled for release on December 25, 2014. On July 21, the release date was changed to May 29, 2015.

The film's first trailer was released on February 11, 2015.

Box office 
Aloha grossed $21.1 million in North America and $5.2 million in other territories for a total gross of $26.3 million, against a $37 million budget.

In North America, Aloha opened simultaneously with the disaster film San Andreas. It made $500,000 from Thursday night showings at 2,275 theaters and an estimated $3.5 million on its opening day from 2,815 theaters. In its opening weekend, the film grossed $9.7 million, finishing 6th at the box office. The film earned $1.65 million in its opening weekend overseas from 7 countries. Australia and New Zealand had an opening weekend combined of $1.5 million and Brazil opened with $240,000. The film went directly to video on demand in the UK and France.

Pamela McClintock at The Hollywood Reporter estimated that the financial losses by the film finished to around $65 million by the time the film ended its global theatrical run, based on a budget of "$37 million-plus".

Critical response 
On Rotten Tomatoes, the film has an approval rating of 20% based on reviews from 166 critics, with an average rating of 4.30/10. The critics' consensus reads: "Meandering and insubstantial, Aloha finds writer-director Cameron Crowe at his most sentimental and least compelling." On Metacritic, the film has a weighted average score of 40 out of 100 based on 36 critics, indicating "mixed or average reviews". CinemaScore polls conducted during the opening weekend, surveyed audiences gave Aloha an average grade of "B−" on an A+ to F scale.

Peter Travers of Rolling Stone wrote: "It gives me no pleasure to report that Aloha is still a mess, a handful of stories struggling for a unifying tone." Andrew Barker of Variety called it Crowe's worst film, saying it was "unbalanced, unwieldy, and at times nearly unintelligible".

Richard Roeper of the Chicago Sun-Times recommended the film despite its flaws, "There ARE times when Aloha doesn’t work — and yet I’m recommending it for its sometimes loony sense of wonder, its trippy spirituality, its brilliant cast and because I seem to be a sap for even the Cameron Crowe movies almost nobody else likes."

Accolades 
The film was nominated for three Teen Choice Awards: Bradley Cooper for Choice Movie Actor: Comedy; 
Emma Stone for Choice Movie Actress: Comedy; and the film itself in the category of Choice Movie: Comedy.

Whitewashing controversy 
The Media Action Network for Asian Americans accused the director and studio of whitewashing the cast, and Crowe apologized about Emma Stone being cast as a character who is stated to be of one quarter Chinese and one quarter Hawaiian descent.

In June 2015, Crowe responded to the backlash: "I have heard your words and your disappointment, and I offer you a heart-felt apology to all who felt this was an odd or misguided casting choice. As far back as 2007, Captain Allison Ng was written to be a super-proud one quarter Hawaiian who was frustrated that, by all outward appearances, she looked nothing like one. A half-Chinese father was meant to show the surprising mix of cultures often prevalent in Hawaii. Extremely proud of her unlikely heritage, she feels personally compelled to over-explain every chance she gets. The character was based on a real-life, red-headed local who did just that."

Sony Pictures defended the film's portrayal of Hawaiian culture stating, "While some have been quick to judge a movie they haven't seen and a script they haven't read, the film "Aloha" respectfully showcases the spirit and culture of the Hawaiian people."

Stone later said she regretted letting herself be inaccurately ethnically cast, and acknowledged whitewashing as a widespread problem in Hollywood. Nevertheless, she echoed Crowe's defense of her casting: "The character was not supposed to look like her background which was a quarter Hawaiian and a quarter Chinese."

During the opening monologue for the 2019 Golden Globe Awards, co-host Sandra Oh alluded to the issue of whitewashing in Hollywood by joking that Crazy Rich Asians (2018) was "the first studio film with an Asian-American lead since Ghost in the Shell and Aloha." This prompted Stone, who was in attendance, to shout "I'm sorry!" in reaction.

References

External links 
 
 
 
 
 

2015 films
2015 romantic comedy-drama films
20th Century Fox films
American romantic comedy-drama films
Columbia Pictures films
2010s English-language films
Race-related controversies in film
Casting controversies in film
Dune Entertainment films
Films directed by Cameron Crowe
Films produced by Scott Rudin
Films scored by Alex Somers
Films set in Hawaii
Films shot in Hawaii
Regency Enterprises films
Films with screenplays by Cameron Crowe
Vinyl Films films
2015 comedy films
2015 drama films
Films about the United States Air Force
2010s American films